Xianzhou or Xian Prefecture (憲州) was a zhou (prefecture) in imperial China in modern Shanxi, China. It existed (intermittently) from 859 to 1151.

Geography
The administrative region of Xianzhou in the Tang dynasty is in modern central Shanxi. It probably includes parts of modern: 
 Under the administration of Taiyuan:
Loufan County
 Under the administration of Xinzhou:
Jingle County

References
 

Prefectures of the Tang dynasty
Prefectures of the Song dynasty
Prefectures of Later Tang
Prefectures of Later Jin (Five Dynasties)
Prefectures of Later Han (Five Dynasties)
Prefectures of Northern Han
Prefectures of the Jin dynasty (1115–1234)
Former prefectures in Shanxi